FGF may refer to:

 Fibroblast growth factor
 Galician Football Federation, in Spain
 Guinean Football Federation
 , the Football Federation of Rio Grande do Sul, Brazil
 , the Football Federation of Goiás, Brazil
 Fédération générale des fonctionnaires, a trade union for French civil servants